Malene Birger is a Danish fashion designer. She co-founded Day Birger et Mikkelsen in 1997 and By Malene Birger in 2003.

Career
Birger graduated from the Danish Design School in 1989. She began her career in the fashion industry in 1989 as designer at Jackpot by Carli Gry. She was also the head designer of women's wear at Marc O'Polo in Stockholm.

In 1997, Birger co-founded the company Day Birger et Mikkelsen. She was the creative director of the company until leaving it in 2002. In 2003, she founded By Malene Birger in collaboration with IC Group. In 2010, Birger sold her share of the company to IC Group. She left the position as creative director in January 2014 and now runs the interior design company Birger1962.

In 2015 she founded the eponymous design consultancy MALENE BIRGER’S WORLD. And she has recently launched a small jewellery collection GOLD&ME. In later years she has also become a successful artist creating art prints which are recognized by black and white abstract brush strokes forming beautiful shapes.

Personal life
Birger currently lives in Majorca. She is a Danish UNICEF ambassador. Four times a year she designed shirts and string bags to sell in order to raise a profit that can be donated to UNICEF.

Awards
In the year of 2002, Birger won the Danish Design Award. She received Guldknappen in the year of 2004 from the Danish fashion magazine Alt for Damerne. In the year of 2005, she received the Scandinavian Design Award. In the year of 2008, Birger won brand of the year by Costume Norway.

References

External links 
 By Malene Birger
 Topchefen godkender alle detaljer, Lederne, August 2008

Danish fashion designers
1972 births
Living people
Danish women fashion designers